Stanadyne LLC (originally known as Stanadyne Automotive Corporation) is a developer and manufacturer of fuel pumps and fuel injectors for diesel and gasoline engines. The company is based in Windsor, Connecticut, with global locations in Changshu, China (Stanadyne Changshu Corporation), Chennai, India (Stanadyne India Private Limited), and Brescia, Italy (Stanadyne S.p.A.). The company also operates a manufacturing facility in Jacksonville, NC. The company specializes in fuel injection equipment producing components for gasoline direct injection engines, Common rail systems, electronic and mechanical governed rotary distributor pumps for diesel engines and diesel fuel injectors. Stanadyne is wholly owned by the private equity firm Kohlberg & Company.

History
The company was founded in 1876 as Hartford Machine Screw Company. It was renamed Standard Screw Company in 1900. The company added additional subsidiaries throughout the early part of the century.

The combined company primarily made screws and other fasteners until the 1950s, when they diversified into fuel injection pumps and consumer faucets.

In March 1970 Standard Screw Company changed its name to Stanadyne.

The Roosa Pump and The Moen Faucet
In May 1947 a deal was made with Vernon D. Roosa to come to Hartford Machine Screw and perfect his fuel injection pump for diesel engines. The project initially cost more than expected with some directors in favor of abandoning, but by 1952 major bugs had been eliminated and the product was ready for market.

Demand for diesel pumps climbed steadily through the 1950s and 60's. However, the oil crisis of the 1970s and General Motors' decision to install diesel engines in passenger cars, significantly stimulated pump sales. By the end of the decade, sales neared $120 million.

In 1956, a deal was struck with Ravenna Metal Projects to acquire the company's first real consumer product — the single-handle faucet developed by Alfred M. Moen.

After a series of false starts, the company initiated a program to sell exclusively through plumbing wholesalers. This was later adapted to include retailers, and during the 1970s Moen sales rose from $40 million in 1972 to $100 million in 1979, one quarter of Stanadyne's total revenue.

Ownership Changes

In the late 1980s ownership and makeup of the company continued to change and evolve. After a series of offers from private equity firms, in 1988, Forstmann Little & Company bought Stanadyne for $820 million. The company's four business units were quickly sold. KSP, another private New York investment firm, bought the automotive products group and the rights to the Stanadyne name in February 1989. KSP renamed the company, Stanadyne Automotive Corp. American Industrial Partners owned Stanadyne from 1997 to 2004, when the company was sold to Kohlberg & Company.

References

Companies based in Hartford County, Connecticut
Manufacturing companies established in 1876
1876 establishments in Connecticut
Manufacturing companies based in Connecticut